Joseph Ponthus (1978 – 24 February 2021) was a French writer.

Biography
Ponthus earned his khâgne in Reims and Nancy. He first worked in the town hall of Nanterre as a special education teacher. In 2015, he moved to Lorient to live with his wife, where he first worked in a fish cannery and a slaughterhouse.

For two years, Ponthus recorded his impressions and feelings as well as those of his colleagues. These recordings were published in January 2019 under the title À la ligne by Éditions de la Table ronde. The book followed a flow of free verse poetry. He explained that "the plant [...] has set the pace: on a production line, everything is linked very quickly. There is no time for pretty subordinates. The gestures are mechanical and the thoughts go to line". It was well received by critics, and journalist  added it to his list of favorite reads on 6 February 2019 on the radio show . In March 2019, the book received the Grand prix RTL-Lire. Even before these awards, the book received much success from bookstores.

Joseph Ponthus died of cancer on 24 February 2021 at the age of 42.

Works
Nous ... la cité (2012)
À la ligne (2019)

References

1978 births
2021 deaths
20th-century French male writers
Place of death missing
21st-century French male writers
Writers from Reims
Deaths from cancer in France